Acokanthera oppositifolia , poison arrow tree, is a shrub used as the source of an arrow poison and to coat caltrops made from the sharp fruits of the puncture vine (Tribulus terrestris). All plants of the genus Acokanthera contain toxic cardiac glycosides strong enough to cause death. Acokanthera oppositifolia is widespread in southern and central Africa from Cape Province north to The Democratic Republic of the Congo + Tanzania.

Acokanthera schimperi is employed for the same purpose.

Unlike all other parts of the plant, the ripe fruit is sweet and edible. Unripe fruit are still poisonous, so only really ripe fruit are eaten.

References

oppositifolia
Plants described in 1792
Flora of Africa
Fruits originating in Africa